Graham Field  is a privately owned public-use airport located one nautical mile (1.85 km) north of the central business district of North Sioux City, in Union County, South Dakota, United States.

Facilities and aircraft 
It has one runway designated 15/33 with a concrete and turf surface measuring 5,300 by 36 feet (1,615 x 11 m).

For the 12-month period ending August 18, 2009, the airport had 324 general aviation aircraft operations, an average of 27 per month.

References

External links 
 Airport diagram from South Dakota DOT
 Aerial image as of 7 October 1991 from USGS The National Map
 

Airports in South Dakota
Buildings and structures in Union County, South Dakota
Transportation in Union County, South Dakota